Ibolya Nagy (9 February 1864, Szentes, Kingdom of Hungary – 22 August 1946, Budapest) was a Hungarian actress. From 1884 to 1923, she was an actress at the National Theatre in Budapest.

Life 
A graduate from the Academy of Drama and Film in Budapest, in 1884, she joined the People's Theatre in Budapest. In 1886, she became a member of the National Theatre via contract, and, in 1923, became a life member of the institution.

Notable roles 
 Molière: Imaginary Patient - Toinette
 Molière: Tartuffe - Dorine
 Goethe: Faust - Márta
 Ede Szigligeti: Liliomfi -  Kamilla

References 
 Magyar Életrajzi Lexikon
 Szentesi Mozaik Kalendárium

19th-century Hungarian actresses
20th-century Hungarian actresses
People from Szentes
1864 births
1946 deaths